Vidin Province is the northwesternmost province of Bulgaria. It borders Serbia to the west and Romania to the northeast. Its administrative centre is the city of Vidin on the Danube river. The area is divided into 11 municipalities. As of December 2009, the province has a population of 108,067 inhabitants.

There are remains of many castles, including Baba Vida, one of the last Bulgarian strongholds during the Ottoman invasion and the Belogradchik fortress.

Municipalities

The Vidin Province contains 11 municipalities (singular: община, obshtina - plural: общини, obshtini). The following table shows the names of each municipality in English and Cyrillic, the main town (in bold) or village, and the population of each as of December 2009.

Geography

The territory of the province includes the most western parts of the Danubian Plain and Stara Planina, while the Danube forms the border with Romania. The slopes of Stara Planina are covered with dense forests, lush meadows and boasts the majestic rock phenomena, the Belogradchik Rocks. There are around 80 caves situated close to the border with Serbia, the most famous being the Magura Cave, which known with its cave painting from 10,000 BC. There is also a lake in the proximity of the cave.

Demographics

Vidin is the oldest province in Bulgaria, with 28.9% of its population 65 years or older at the end of 2016. There is a big difference between the percentage elderly living in urban and rural areas: in urban areas 21.1% of the population is 65 years or older while that percentage is 42.8% in rural areas. The percentage of children up to 15 years is 13.5% in urban areas and only 9.8% in rural areas.

The following table represents the change of the population in the province after World War II:

Ethnic groups

Total population (2011 census): 101 018

Ethnic groups (2011 census):
Identified themselves: 95 126 persons:
Bulgarians: 86 802 (91,25%)
Romani:  7 282 (7,66%)
Others and indefinable:  1 042 ( 1,10 % )

Religion

Religious adherence in the province according to 2001 census:

Towns and villages 
The place names in bold have the status of town (in Bulgarian: град, transliterated as grad). Other localities have the status of village (in Bulgarian: село, transliterated as selo). The names of localities are transliterated in Latin alphabet followed in parentheses by the original name in Bulgarian Cyrillic alphabet (which links to the corresponding Bulgarian Wikipedia article).

Belogradchik Municipality 

The Belogradchik municipality has one town (in bold) and 17 villages:

Boynitsa Municipality 

The Boynitsa municipality has 9 villages:

Bregovo Municipality 

The Bregovo municipality has one town (in bold) and 9 villages:

Vidin Municipality 

The Vidin municipality has two towns (in bold) and 33 villages:

Gramada Municipality 

The Gramada municipality has one town (in bold) and 7 villages:

Dimovo Municipality 

The Dimovo municipality has one town (in bold) and 22 villages:

Kula Municipality 

The Kula municipality has one town (in bold) and 8 villages:

Makresh Municipality 

The Makresh municipality has 7 villages:

Novo Selo 

The Novo Selo municipality has 5 villages:

Ruzhintsi Municipality 

The Ruzhintsi municipality has 10 villages:

Chuprene Municipality 

The Chuprene municipality has 9 villages:

See also
Provinces of Bulgaria
List of villages in Vidin Province

References

External links 
 Official site

 
Provinces of Bulgaria